Ephestia rectivittella is a species of snout moth in the genus Ephestia. It was described by Ragonot in 1901, and is known from Madagascar.

References

Moths described in 1901
Phycitini